Zarnow may refer to:

Żarnów
Gmina Żarnów
Zarnow (river), a river in Germany

See also